= Portugal National Ice Hockey Championship =

- Sport: Ice hockey
- Founded: 2000
- Folded: 2001
- No. of teams: 3
- Country: Portugal
- Last champion: Viseu Lobos

The Portugal National Championship was the national ice hockey championship in Portugal. It was only contested for the 2000–01 season. All games were played at the Palácio do Gelo in Viseu. Ice practices and friendly games have been held since 2010 in Elvas, Portugal.

== 2000-01 season ==
=== Final Table ===
	Club	GP	W	L	T	GF–GA	Pts
1.	Viseu Lobos	8	7	0	1	123:48	15
2.	Lisbon Stars	8	2	5	1	63:94	5
3.	Serta Vikings	8	2	6	0	32:76	4

=== Schedule ===
Date	Team	Team	Score
19/11/2000	Viseu Lobos	Sertã Vikings	18–2
26/11/2000	Viseu Lobos	Lisbon Stars	14–12
10/12/2000	Lisbon Stars	Sertã Vikings	9–5
17/12/2000	Sertã Vikings	Viseu Lobos	3–18
14/01/2001	Lisbon Stars	Sertã Vikings	10–1
28/01/2001	Viseu Lobos	Sertã Vikings	15–1
11/02/2001	Lisbon Stars	Viseu Lobos	11–29
24/02/2001	Viseu Lobos	Lisbon Stars	10-10
25/02/2001	Viseu Lobos	Sertã Vikings	Viseu wins Sertã Vikings by no-show
11/03/2001	Sertã Vikings	Lisbon Stars	8–5
25/03/2001	Sertã Vikings	Lisbon Stars	8–1
